The Union populaire française (UPF, English: "French Popular Union") was a parliamentary group in the French Parliament formed in 1939 by breakaway members of the French Communist Party who opposed the Molotov-Ribbentrop Pact. Prominent members included Émile Fouchard, Eugène Jardon and René Nicod.

References

Political parties of the French Third Republic
Defunct political parties in France
Political parties established in 1939
1939 establishments in France
Political parties with year of disestablishment missing